Vaudois can refer to:

 Waldensians, members of a Christian sect also known as Vaudois
 People who live in the canton of Vaud, Switzerland
 A Franco-Provençal language dialect spoken in Vaud